D36 may refer to:

Ships 
 , an Alan M. Sumner-class destroyer of the Brazilian Navy
 , a Type 45 destroyer of the Royal Navy
 , a V-class destroyer of the Royal Navy
 , a Yugoslavian passenger ship seized by the Italian Navy

Other uses 
 D36 road (Croatia)
 LNER Class D36, a class of British steam locomotives
 Lotarev D-36, a turbofan engine